Wulfhall or Wolfhall is an early 17th-century manor house in Burbage parish, Wiltshire, England. A previous manor house on the same site, at that time in the parish of Great Bedwyn, was the seat of the Seymour family, a member of which, Jane Seymour, was queen to King Henry VIII.

Late medieval and Tudor manor house

The medieval manor house was probably a timber framed double courtyard house, incorporating two towers (demolished 1569), a long gallery, a chapel, and several other rooms. It was built in the early 1530s with financial assistance from Thomas Cromwell and Henry VIII.

The Seymours reached the peak of their influence in the 16th century, when Jane Seymour became the third wife of King Henry VIII. Her son became Edward VI and ruled England from 1547 to 1553. At the beginning of Edward's reign, he was nine years old and his eldest uncle, Edward Seymour, 1st Duke of Somerset, was Lord High Protector of England, while another uncle, Thomas Seymour, 1st Baron Seymour of Sudeley, married Henry VIII's widow, Catherine Parr.  Both Edward and Thomas Seymour were eventually executed for treason.

Henry VIII stayed at Wulfhall during his royal progress of 1535.  This may have been when he first courted Jane Seymour, leading eventually to the decision to execute his second wife, Anne Boleyn, following her failure to produce a son and heir. There is a belief arising from the writing of 19th-century antiquary John Britton that Henry and Jane held a wedding feast in the Long Barn at Wulfhall. They were in fact married in the Queen's Closet at Whitehall Palace in London.

Edward Seymour desired grander accommodation than Wulfhall could provide, and intended to replace the house with a new mansion on a nearby hill, Bedwyn Brail, with design and construction supervised by his steward, Sir John Thynne, founder of Longleat House. A correspondence survives, dated between November 1548 and June 1549, that shows Thynne directing the plans. The mansion was unfinished when Seymour fell from power, and was abandoned after his execution in January 1552. His son Edward was unable to maintain Wulfhall, which rapidly deteriorated.

Wulfhall was "derelict and abandoned after 1571" as the family had relocated to nearby Tottenham Park. It was used as accommodation for servants until considerably reduced in size in the 1660s and demolished in 1723. A few ruins survived until the beginning of the 20th century, but nothing now remains above ground; the foundations were uncovered in a 2017–18 excavation. The barn where Henry and Jane supposedly held a feast to celebrate their marriage burnt down in the 1920s.

Present manor house
The present manor house dates back to the early 17th century, having started life as a simple farmhouse. It was expanded in the 18th century and has a Victorian façade.

The current owners of the manor house are the Binney family, who inherited the property on the death of their mother in 2013. Seven people live in the main house, which has been partitioned for tenants. In February 2015, Dominic Binney said, "Over the years we have had many people feeling a presence here that makes their hair stand on end – something that is definitely not explained by an old house's sounds and creaky floorboards. I've absolutely felt and heard unexplained things. We had mediums and psychics come here to chase the ghosts away."

A neighbouring farmhouse named Wolfhall Farm stands on a minor road leading away, east-north-east, from Burbage towards Crofton, where it crosses the Kennet and Avon Canal and the railway. The farmhouse is some 200 yards from the site of Wulfhall and dates from the late 16th century.

In fiction
Wulfhall is the inspiration for the title of Wolf Hall, the Man Booker Prize-winning novel by English author Hilary Mantel, as well as its sequel, Bring Up the Bodies, which also won the Man Booker Prize and begins with the 1535 arrival of the King at Wolf Hall.

Further reading
A P Baggs, J Freeman, C Smith, J H Stevenson and E Williamson, 'Great Bedwyn', Victoria County History, Wiltshire, Volume 16, Kinwardstone Hundred, ed. D A Crowley, London, 1999, pp. 8–49, Manors and other Estates, Wolfhall

References

External links
Real Wolfhall – website by the current owners

Country houses in Wiltshire
Deserted medieval villages in Wiltshire
Hamlets in Wiltshire
Grade II listed buildings in Wiltshire
Grade II listed houses